Outremont  may refer to:

Outremont, Quebec - a borough and former town in Montreal
Outremont (electoral district) - a Canadian federal electoral district
Outremont (provincial electoral district) - a Quebec provincial electoral district